Ruadh-stac Beag (896 m) is a mountain in the Northwest Highlands of Scotland. An outlier of the Munro Beinn Eighe but a mountain in its own right, it is located in the Torridon Hills of Wester Ross.

The mountain has rocky crags and steep slopes on all sides, but is usually climbed from the south. The nearest village is Kinlochewe.

References

Mountains and hills of the Northwest Highlands
Marilyns of Scotland
Corbetts